is a Japanese football player who plays for Albirex Niigata (S).

Club career statistics
Updated to 23 February 2016.

References

External links

 Profile at Oita Trinita

1994 births
Living people
Association football people from Kagoshima Prefecture
Japanese footballers
J2 League players
J3 League players
Giravanz Kitakyushu players
Oita Trinita players
Association football midfielders